This is a list of the 149 inductees to the Country Music Hall of Fame and Museum, counting groups as a single inductee. Of these, 14 inductions are solo female performers, and 1 induction is a female duet. Roy Rogers is unique in that he was inducted twice: in 1980 as a member of the Sons of the Pioneers and again in 1988 as a solo artist. As of 2022, 15 members of the Country Music Hall of Fame are also inducted into the Rock and Roll Hall of Fame.

1960s

1970s

1980s

1990s

2000s

2010s

2020s

Also in the Rock Hall of Fame

See also 
 Grand Ole Opry
 National Recording Registry

References

External links 
 Country Music Hall of Fame (inductees)

 List

Inductees